The International Day of the Unborn Child is an annual commemoration of unborn fetuses, observed as a day of opposition to abortion, on March 25. It was established by Pope John Paul II to coincide with the Feast of the Annunciation. John Paul II viewed the day as "a positive option in favour of life and the spread of a culture for life to guarantee respect for human dignity in every situation".

History
In 1993, El Salvador became the first nation to officially celebrate what was called a Day of the Right to Be Born. Subsequently other countries have initiated official celebrations for the unborn, such as Argentina with the Day of the Unborn in 1998, and Chile with Day of the Conceived and Unborn, Guatemala with the National Day of the Unborn, and Costa Rica with the National Day of Life Before Birth, all in 1999. Nicaragua began observing the Day of the Unborn Child in 2000, the Dominican Republic in 2001, Peru in 2002, Paraguay in 2003, the Philippines in 2004, Honduras in 2005, Ecuador in 2006, and Puerto Rico in 2018. Chile began observing the Day of the Unborn Child and Adoption in 2013. The promotion of the International Day of the Unborn Child was endorsed by the Knights of Columbus.

References

International observances
March observances
Anti-abortion movement